Aapo Ilves (born 20 October 1970, in Räpina) is an Estonian poet, writer, playwright, artist and musician.
He writes in Estonian, Võro and Seto languages. Ilves has also written song lyrics for other artists, including several "Hits of the Year" and also Estonian Eurovision entries "Tii" in 2004 and Kuula in 2012.

He has published nine solo books, two solo CD's and many books and CD's with friends. Ilves has also written many plays, including several librettos for the Estonian National Opera. He has won the Estonian National Broadcast's radio contest "Battle of Poetry".

Ilves is a member of Estonian Writers' Union, Estonian Authors' Society and formerly  (1996–2009).

He has contributed his writings and drawings to many journals and newspapers including children's journal Täheke and the only Võro language newspaper Uma Leht.

References

External links

1970 births
Living people
People from Räpina
Estonian male poets
20th-century Estonian male artists
21st-century Estonian male artists
Estonian musicians
Estonian dramatists and playwrights
20th-century Estonian poets
21st-century Estonian poets
20th-century Estonian musicians
21st-century Estonian musicians